Seetha Kalyanam, was an Indian Malayalam-language television soap opera drama. The show  premiered on general entertainment channel Asianet channel and streaming on Disney+ Hotstar from 10 September 2018. Malayalam film actress Dhanya Mary Varghese plays the titular role in the show. The show is the official remake of Telugu soap opera Lakshmi Kalyanam which aired on Star Maa. The show aired its last episode on 10 September  2021.

It replaced Parasparam, the longest running serial in Malayalam, which completed 1524 Episodes.

Plot
Seetha and Swathi are sisters from a poor household supported by their mother. Their mother dies and leaves Swathi in Seetha's care telling her that Swathi is now like her daughter. Seetha works to fund Swathi's education, remaining illiterate herself.

Years later
A grown-up Seetha and Swathi meet Rajeshwari, a bad-tempered and arrogant woman who hates poor people. Seetha gets into a fight with Rajeshwari and later apologises to her driver Kalyan. A humiliated Rajeshwari vows to take revenge from the sisters. Kalyan, who is in fact Rajeshwari's elder son, falls in love with Seetha. Swathi tries to commit suicide but is stopped by Seetha who is shocked to find out that Swathi is pregnant with her ex-boyfriend's child. Her ex-boyfriend is revealed to be Ajay, Rajeshwari's younger son.

Seetha helps Ajay and Swathi reunite. Rajeshwari is forced to accept them after Ajay tries to commit suicide. It is then revealed that Rajeshwari is in fact Kalyan's maternal aunt and step-mother. She finds a will bequeathing the entire property to Kalyan and plots to marry him to a sterile woman so he can never have children who can inherit.

Seetha and Kalyan fall in love. Rajeshwari demands Seetha marry her older son Kalyan and sign an agreement that she will never bear children and only then will she agree to Swathi and Ajay's marriage. Seetha agrees and breaks up with Kalyan. Swathi tries to stop Seetha but fails. On the wedding day, Kalyan and Seetha discover they are marrying each other and are shocked.

Seetha tries to win Kalyan's heart but all in vain. She starts working with the kalaakaars at the textile factory and wins them over helping them get their jobs back from Rajeshwari, thus impressing Kalyan. She then helps Kalyan track down his biological mother Ambika who had been accused of murder and is hated by Kalyan's father Venu because of misunderstandings created by Rajeshwari. This brings them closer and he accepts that she must have had a reason for rejecting him.

Later, Seetha gets pregnant too. However, Rajeshwari makes another evil move. She hires goons to kidnap Kalyan. Later, a lawyer named Jayadevan claims that Rajeshwari is his wife. Rajeshwari is shocked and worried.

It is later revealed in a flashback that, Rajeshwari's real name was Radhika Devi. She was from a wealthy family. She fell in love with Jayadevan, the son of a police officer. His father, had wished his son and his nephew, Hariprasad "Hari" to be an officer just like him.

Jayadevan and Hari is happy with the idea. It is also shown that Hari was in love with Jayasudha, the sister of Jayadevan. It is shown that Radhika, desperately wanted to marry Jayadevan. However, Jayadevan denied it to follow his dreams. Agitated, Radhika threatened him that she would commit suicide. Helpless, Jayadevan agrees. Soon, after Radhika gives birth to Aswathy, but she is mentally disabled because of which Radhika hates her and attempts to kill her, which fails.

Meanwhile, Jayadevan is in jail for the crime he didn't commit. After, releasing Jayadevan gets to know of Radhika's evil motives. However, he is shattered to learn that Radhika also murdered his family except Hari. Jayadevan and Hari joins hands to revenge. Jayadevan studies law and becomes a lawyer. Not knowing any of these, Ajay suspects Rajeshwari's evil motives and trusts Jayadevan. However, Jayadevan struggles to tell Ajay that he is Ajay's father.

Seetha brings in two children, Meenakshi "Meenu" and the other is none other than Aswathy "Achu" (She grew up under the care of Jayadevan), now a grown up girl. Achu and Meenu dislikes Rajeshwari. Meenu is later kidnapped, by Annadurai, Rajeshwari's goon.

Kalyan, is now a drug addict. However, Seetha manages to get Rajeshwari arrested and rescues Kalyan and Meenu. Ajay, realises that Jayadevan is his father and Achu is his sister. The show ends joyously with Jayadevan, Ajay, Kalyan, Meenu, Swathi and Seetha rejoicing, Rajeshwari's defeat.

Cast

Lead Cast
 Dhanya Mary Varghese as Seetha – Swathi's sister; Sravani's half-sister; Kalyan's wife
 Eva as Child Seetha
 Reneesha Rehman as Swathi – Seetha's sister; Sravani's half-sister; Ajay's wife
 Baby Athmika as Child Swathi 
 Roopa Sree as Radhika "Rajeshwari" Devi – Ambika's sister; Venu and Jayadevan's wife; Ajay and Aswathy's mother; Kalyan's step-mother 
  Souparnika Subhash as Young Radhika Devi
 Anoop Krishnan / Alif Shah as Kalyan – Ambika and Venu's son; Radhika's step-son; Ajay and Aswathy's cousin; Seetha's husband
 Jithu Venugopal as Ajay – Radhika and Jayadevan's son; Aswathy's brother; Kalyan's cousin; Swathi's husband
 Sona Nair as Ambika Devi aka Saradananda Swamikal – Radhika's sister; Venu's ex-wife; Kalyan's mother
 Anand Thrissur / Amith as Venu – Ambika's ex-husband; Radhika's first husband; Kalyan's father
Rahul Mohan as Jayadevan – Jayasudha's brother; Hariprasad's cousin; Radhika's husband; Ajay and Aswathy's father

Recurring Cast
J Padmanabhan Thampi as Moorthy
Adithyan Jayan as SP Hariprasad IPS – Jayadevan and Jayasudha's cousin
Amboori Jayan as Mahendran
Souparnika Subhash as Ashwathy aka Achu – Radhika and Jayadevan's daughter; Ajay's sister; Kalyan's cousin
Gopika Janardhanan as SP Pooja IPS
Archana Suseelan as Sravani Saigal – Seetha and Swathi's half-sister
 Tom Jacob as Annadurai 
Manu Varma as Jayadevan and Hariprasad's father
Haridas as Hrishikeshananda Swamikal
Disciple of Saradananda Swamikal and spoilt brat who aims to take over Swami's wealth
Ranjith Raj as SP Goutham IPS
Saji Surya as CI Musthafa
Joshy Varghese as DYSP Mahesh
Vimala as Shantha, Rajeshwari's Servant
Hareendran as Hari
Rajmohan as Hareendra Varma
Anoop Sivasenan as Abhiram
Sini Varghese as Nayana/Shreya
Anzil Rahman as Abhiram's Friend 
Subbalakshmi as Sravani's grandmother
Anugraha as Minnu, Achu's Friend 
Asha Nair as Nimmy
 Pala Aravindan as Mashammavan
 Sheeji Master as D2A2
Sreekutty as Pramila
Raima Rai as Nurse, Mashammavan's daughter
Surya Mohan as Sandra
Aparna Nair as CI Nirmala
Manu Gopinathan as Theeppori Bhaskaran 
 as Dr. Reshma
Leela Manacaud

Guest Appearance
 Leena Nair as Seetha and Swathi's mother (Dead)
 Della George as herself (Episode 11)
 Pratheeksha G Pradeep as herself (Episode 11)
 Haritha G Nair as herself (Episode 11)
 Vindhuja Vikraman as host (Episode 11)
 Rohini M Jayachandran as Anchor (Episode 33)
Mareena Michael Kurisingal as Marina in Maha episode (Episode 362)

Awards and Reception
12th Asianet Television Awards 2019

 Best Star Pair –Anoop krishnan and Dhanya mary varghese
 Performer In a Negative Role -Roopasree

This is the third serial among the 5  top rated serials in Malayalam television with 4.46 million impressions (Week 05, 2019) following Vanambadi and Neelakkuyil, according to BARC India. The TRPs of weeks in month January 2019 is shown below.

January 2019

Adaptations

References

External links

Indian television series
Indian television soap operas
Serial drama television series
2018 Indian television series debuts
Malayalam-language television shows
Indian drama television series
Asianet (TV channel) original programming